Jacques Raymond (Ray) Chénier (born August 7, 1935, in Hanmer, Ontario; died November 2, 2022, in Timmins, Ontario) is a Canadian former politician, who represented the electoral district of Timmins—Chapleau in the House of Commons of Canada from 1979 to 1984. He was a member of the Liberal Party.

Chénier served as parliamentary secretary to the Minister of Indian Affairs and Northern Development from 1980 to 1982.

He did not stand for reelection in the 1984 election.

He subsequently stood as the Liberal candidate in Timmins—James Bay for the 2004 federal election, but was not reelected to the House.

References

1935 births
Members of the House of Commons of Canada from Ontario
Liberal Party of Canada MPs
Living people
Politicians from Greater Sudbury